The Benguela house gecko (Hemidactylus benguellensis) is a species of gecko. It is endemic to Angola and Namibia.

References

Hemidactylus
Reptiles described in 1893
Taxa named by José Vicente Barbosa du Bocage